Alaric Alfred Watts (18 February 1825 – 1901), best known as A. A. Watts, was a British government clerk, spiritualist and writer.

He was educated at University College School and worked as a clerk at the Inland Revenue Office. He was the son of Alaric Alexander Watts. In 1859 he married Anna Mary Howitt. Watts was a convinced spiritualist. In 1882 with his friend William Stainton Moses, he formed The Ghost Club. He was a member of the London Spiritualist Alliance.

Watts was member of the Society for Psychical Research. He resigned after some of its members such as Eleanor Sidgwick dismissed the medium William Eglinton as fraudulent.

Watts was also a poet, publishing, jointly with his wife, a volume entitled Aurora: a volume of verse.

Publications

Aurora: A Volume of Verse (1875)
Alaric Watts: A Narrative of His Life (Volume 1, Volume 2 1884)

References

1825 births
1901 deaths
Alumni of University College London
British spiritualists
Parapsychologists